The 2017 Philippine Basketball Association (PBA) Commissioner's Cup, also known as the 2017 Oppo-PBA Commissioner's Cup for sponsorship reasons, was the second conference of the 2016–17 PBA season. The tournament allows teams to hire foreign players or imports with a height limit of 6'10".

The tournament had two breaks with no games scheduled for more than seven days: first during the All-Star Week (April 26 to 30) and second during the SEABA Championship (May 12 to 18).

Format
The following format will be observed for the duration of the conference: 
 Single-round robin eliminations; 11 games per team; Teams are then seeded by basis on win–loss records.
Top eight teams will advance to the quarterfinals. In case of tie, a playoff game will be held only for the #8 seed.
Quarterfinals:
QF1: #1 vs #8 (#1 twice-to-beat)
QF2: #2 vs #7 (#2 twice-to-beat)
QF3: #3 vs #6 (best-of-3 series)
QF4: #4 vs #5 (best-of-3 series)
Semifinals (best-of-5 series):
SF1: QF1 Winner vs. QF4 Winner
SF2: QF2 Winner vs. QF3 Winner
Finals (best-of-7 series)
F1: SF1 Winner vs SF2 Winner

Elimination round

Team standings

Schedule

Results

Eighth seed playoff

Bracket

Quarterfinals

(1) Barangay Ginebra vs. (8) GlobalPort

(2) San Miguel vs. (7) Phoenix

(3) Star vs. (6) Rain or Shine

(4) TNT vs. (5) Meralco

Semifinals

(1) Barangay Ginebra vs. (4) TNT

(2) San Miguel vs. (3) Star

Finals

{{basketballbox |bg=#fff |date=July 2  |time=6:30pm  |place=Smart Araneta Coliseum, Quezon City |TV=TV5 
| team1= TNT KaTropa | score1= 91
| team2= San Miguel Beermen | score2= 115'| report = Box score
| series = San Miguel wins series, 4–2
}}

 Imports 
The following is the list of imports, which had played for their respective teams at least once, with the returning imports in italics''. Highlighted are the imports who stayed with their respective teams for the whole conference.

Awards

Conference
Best Player of the Conference: Chris Ross 
Bobby Parks Best Import of the Conference: Charles Rhodes 
Finals MVP: Alex Cabagnot

Players of the Week

References

External links
 PBA.ph

Commissioner's Cup
PBA Commissioner's Cup